The term Gaza conflict may refer to any of the following events:
 Gaza–Israel conflict
 Hamas-Jund Ansar Allah clash (2009)
 Battle of Gaza (2007) (Hamas-Fatah conflict)
 First Battle of Gaza, during World War I
 Second Battle of Gaza, during World War I

See also
 Battle of Gaza (disambiguation)
 Gaza War (disambiguation)